The McAllister House is a historic house located on 423 N. Cascade Ave. in Colorado Springs, Colorado. It was added to the National Register of Historic Places on August 14, 1973. It was owned by Henry McAllister and was opened as a public museum in 1961.

References

External links
 McAllister House Museum

Houses on the National Register of Historic Places in Colorado
Colorado State Register of Historic Properties
Buildings and structures in Colorado Springs, Colorado
Houses in El Paso County, Colorado
National Register of Historic Places in Colorado Springs, Colorado
Museums in Colorado Springs, Colorado
Historic house museums in Colorado